Microvirga massiliensis  is a bacterium from the genus of Microvirga which has been isolated from human feces in Dielmo in Senegal.

References 

Hyphomicrobiales
Bacteria described in 2016